Taglak (also known as Taglag) is a village in Rahal Rural District, in the Central District of Khoy County, West Azerbaijan Province, Iran. At the 2006 census, its population was 912, in 216 families.

References 

Populated places in Khoy County